Xiangxiang is a county-level city under the administration of Xiangtan, Hunan province, China. It has four subdistricts, 15 towns and three townships under its jurisdiction, the government seat is Wangchunmen.

History
As a place name, 'Xiangxiang' dates back to BCE 3 in the Eastern Han Dynasty when Emperor Ai of Han bestowed it upon Changsha Prince Liu Chang. In the years leading up to 1952, Xiangxiang's territory included present day Shaoshan, Shuangfeng County and Loudi.

Administrative divisions
There are numerous township-level divisions in Xiangxiang.

Notable people
Zeng Guofan
Mao Zedong attended high school in the city.
Zhou Qunfei
Xiao Zisheng
Zeng Baosun
Cai Chang
Xiao San
Chung Ching
Wang Songling, medical scientist and member of the Chinese Academy of Sciences (CAS).

Climate

References

External links
Official website

 
County-level divisions of Xiangtan
Cities in Hunan